Wingspan is an album by jazz pianist Mulgrew Miller with a quintet of other musicians. The album was recorded on May 11, 1987, and released later that year by Landmark Records.

Reception

Scott Yanow of Allmusic wrote that "The emphasis on this quintet album is on Mulgrew Miller's compositions; five of the seven numbers (all but Kenny Garrett's "Sonhos Do Brasil" and the standard "I Remember You") are by the pianist/leader. Miller is joined by bassist Charnett Moffett, drummer Tony Reedus, vibraphonist Steve Nelson and altoist Garrett (who plays flute on one song); percussionist Rudy Bird guests on three numbers. The inventive solos on the fairly complex material and the attractive sound of the ensembles make this a worthy release".

Track listing

Personnel
Band
Mulgrew Miller – piano
Charnett Moffett – bass
Tony Reedus – drums
Rudy Bird – percussion (tracks: 2 5 7)
Kenny Garrett – saxophone, flute 
Steve Nelson – vibraphone

Production
Orrin Keepnews – producer
George Horn – mastering 
Tom Mark – recording

References

1987 albums
Landmark Records albums
Albums produced by Orrin Keepnews
Mulgrew Miller albums